Hisao Heiuchi (塀内 久雄, born July 7, 1981) is a Japanese former professional baseball infielder. He played from 2002 to 2013 with the Chiba Lotte Marines in Japan's Nippon Professional Baseball.

External links

NPB

1981 births
Chiba Lotte Marines players
Japanese baseball players
Living people
Nippon Professional Baseball infielders
Baseball people from Ehime Prefecture